Lauria is an Italian town and comune of the province of Potenza, in Basilicata, situated near the borders of Calabria.

Lauria may also refer to:
 Francesco Lorenzo Brancati di Lauria (1612-1693), Italian cardinal and theologian
 Lauria (gastropod), a genus of land snail in the family Lauriidae. Species in that genus include:
 Lauria cylindracea (Common chrysalis snail)
 Lauria fanalensis
 Lauria sempronii
 Lauria Nandangarh, a city/town in West Champaran district, Bihar state, northern India
 Roger of Lauria ( – 1305), Sicilian admiral in Aragonese service

Lauria is a surname of Italian origin. People with that name include:
 Carmelo Lauría Lesseur (1936-2010), Venezuelan businessman, lawyer and politician
 Dan Lauria (born 1947), American television, stage, and film actor
 Fabio Lauria (born 1986), Italian footballer
 Lissa Lauria (active from 2002), American actress and recording artist
 Lorenzo Lauria (born 1947), Italian international and world champion bridge player
 Matt Lauria (born 1982), American actor and musician
 Nando Lauria (born 1960), Brazilian musician
 Nicolás Lauría Calvo (born 1974), Argentine footballer
 Victoria Lauría, fictional character in the 2012 Argentine telenovela Graduados

See also 
 Italian ironclad Ruggiero di Lauria, a pre-dreadnought battleship built in the 1880s, named after Roger of Lauria
 Ruggiero di Lauria-class ironclad

 Laura (disambiguation)
 Laurel (disambiguation)
 Lauri (disambiguation)
 Laurie (disambiguation)
 

Surnames of Italian origin